Barbara González Oteiza (born 15 January 1985) is a model, and was a Spanish group rhythmic gymnast. She represented her nation at international competitions.

Biography
Originally from Pamplona, she participated at the 2004 Summer Olympics and the 2008 Summer Olympics in Beijing. She also competed at world championships, including at the 2005 and 2007 World Rhythmic Gymnastics Championships. Barbara is the sister of rhythmic gymnast Lara González.

References

External links
  sports-reference.com
  laht.com
  yahoo.com
  lucire.com
  gettyimages.com

1985 births
Living people
Spanish rhythmic gymnasts
Sportspeople from Pamplona
Gymnasts at the 2008 Summer Olympics
Gymnasts at the 2004 Summer Olympics
Olympic gymnasts of Spain
20th-century Spanish women
21st-century Spanish women